The Turbomeca Arriel is a series of French turboshaft engines that first ran in 1974.
Delivering , over 12,000 Arriel engines have been produced from 1978 to 2018, logging more than 50 million flight hours for 40 helicopter applications.
In June 2018, 1,000 Arriel 2D were in service, powering H125 and H130 single-engine helicopters, having logged one million flight hours since 2011.
After endurance tests and fleet data analysis, their TBO increased by 25% to 5,000 hours and mandatory inspection rose to 15 years with no hourly limit, lowering maintenance costs.

The Liming WZ-8 (turboshaft) and Liming WJ-9 (turboprop) are the designations for Turbomeca Arriel production in China. In 2021 Safran opened a production facility in Grand Prairie, Texas for production of Arriel 2E engines, which had previously only been produced in France.

Applications
 AgustaWestland AW109
 Eurocopter AS365 Dauphin
 Eurocopter AS565 Panther
 Eurocopter EC130
 Eurocopter EC145
 Eurocopter EC155
 Eurocopter AS350 Écureuil
 Harbin Z-9
 Harbin Z-19
 Kopter AW09
 MBB/Kawasaki BK 117
 Sikorsky S-76

Specifications (Arriel 1)

See also

References

External links

 Turbomeca Arriel official site

1970s turboshaft engines
Arriel